Střížkov is an area of the Czech capital Prague, divided between the districts Prague 8 and Prague 9. Střížkov has 14,297 inhabitants (2015).

Transport

Střížkov station on the Prague Metro's Line C serves the district. There are also several buses coming through the area.

Sport

The district was home to an association football club, FK Bohemians Prague (Střížkov).

References 

Districts of Prague